Olympic Mostakbel Ruisseau el-Annasser, known as OMR el-Annasser or simply OMR for short, is an Algerian football club based in the Belouizdad quarter of Algiers. The club was founded on 1962 and its colours are black and white. Their home stadium, Stade 20 Août 1955, has a capacity of 10,000 spectators. The club is currently playing in the Inter-Régions Division.

History
It was founded in 1962, the year of the Algerian Independence. The club played one season in the Algerian Ligue Professionnelle 1 before being relegated to the Algerian Championnat National 2 one year later. The team was relegated to the Championnat National de Football Amateur after the 2008/2009 season.

Stadium
The team played its home matches in Stade 20 Août 1955, which seats 15,000.

Honours
 Algerian Championnat National 2 (01)
 Champion : 2006

Current squad

Sponsors

Notes

Football clubs in Algeria
Association football clubs established in 1962
Football clubs in Algiers
1962 establishments in Algeria
Sports clubs in Algeria